The 2023 George Mason Patriots baseball team represent George Mason University during the 2023 NCAA Division I baseball season. The Patriots play their home games at Spuhler Field as a member of the Atlantic 10 Conference. They are led by head coach Shawn Camp, in his fourth season at Mason, and his first as a head coach.

This was the first season since 1981 that Bill Brown did not coach George Mason. Brown retired at the conclusion of 2022 season.

Previous season

The 2022 team finished the season with a 22–33 (13–11 Atlantic 10) record, and finished in fifth place of the Atlantic 10. They went 1–2 in the 2022 Atlantic 10 baseball tournament.

Preseason

Preseason Atlantic 10 awards and honors
Infielder Cam Redding was named to the All-Atlantic 10 Preseason team.

Coaches poll 
The Atlantic 10 baseball coaches' poll was released on February 7, 2023. George Mason was picked to finish eighth in the Atlantic 10.

Personnel

Starters

Roster

Coaching staff

Offseason

Signing Day Recruits
The following players signed National Letter of Intents to play for George Mason in 2023.

Game log

Rankings

References

External links 
 GMU Baseball

George Mason Patriots
George Mason Patriots baseball seasons
George Mason Patriots baseball